Joyce Ssebugwawo is a Ugandan politician, entrepreneur and a former minister in the Buganda government. She joined the Buganda government in early 1980s where she have worked as a Minister for women, community work and mobilization. A former National Chairperson of Forum for Democratic Change, she is a former Mayor for Rubaga Division in Kampala and an aunt to Queen Sylvia of Buganda.

See also 

 Forum for Democratic Change
 Rubaga Division
Kampala Capital City Authority
Divisions of Kampala
Index of Uganda-related articles

References

External links 

 Website of the Parliament of Uganda.

Living people
Makerere University alumni
Ugandan businesspeople
Ganda people
People from Kampala District
People from Central Region, Uganda
Forum for Democratic Change politicians
21st-century Ugandan women politicians
21st-century Ugandan politicians
Year of birth missing (living people)